The table below details the European Championship results of Alfa Romeo. The other tables show the results of Alfa Romeo in Formula One.

Complete European Championship results
(key) (results in bold indicate pole position, results in italics indicate fastest lap)

Notes
  – Indicates shared drive, no points for the driver who took over.

Complete Formula One results

As a constructor

1950–1985
(key)

2019–present
(key)

Notes
 * – Season still in progress.
  – The driver did not finish the Grand Prix, but was classified, as he completed over 90% of the race distance.
  – The Constructors' Championship was not awarded until .
  – Indicates a shared drive.

Non-works entries
(key)

As an engine supplier
(key)

Non-championship Formula One results
(key) (Results in bold indicate pole position; results in italics indicate fastest lap)

References

Formula One constructor results
Alfa Romeo in motorsport
Results